Blairstown Township School District is a community public school district that serves students in Blairstown Township, in Warren County, New Jersey, United States, that serves students in pre-kindergarten through sixth grade. Students from Hardwick Township, a non-operating school district attend Blairstown Elementary School.

As of the 2020–21 school year, the district, comprised of one school, had an enrollment of 407 students and 44.0 classroom teachers (on an FTE basis), for a student–teacher ratio of 9.3:1.

The district is classified by the New Jersey Department of Education as being in District Factor Group "FG", the fourth-highest of eight groupings. District Factor Groups organize districts statewide to allow comparison by common socioeconomic characteristics of the local districts. From lowest socioeconomic status to highest, the categories are A, B, CD, DE, FG, GH, I and J.

Students in seventh through twelfth grades for public school attend the North Warren Regional High School in Blairstown, a public secondary high school, serving students from the townships of Blairstown, Frelinghuysen, Hardwick, and Knowlton. As of the 2020–21 school year, the high school had an enrollment of 706 students and 64.6 classroom teachers (on an FTE basis), for a student–teacher ratio of 10.9:1.

Schools
Blairstown Elementary School served 403 students in grades PreK-6, as of the 2020–21 school year.
Colleen Silvestri, Principal

Administration
Core members of the district's administration are:
Mark Saalfield, Superintendent
Matthew P. Herzer, School Business Administrator / Board Secretary

Board of education
The district's board of education is comprised of nine members who set policy and oversee the fiscal and educational operation of the district through its administration. As a Type II school district, the board's trustees are elected directly by voters to serve three-year terms of office on a staggered basis, with three seats up for election each year held (since 2012) as part of the November general election. The board appoints a superintendent to oversee the district's day-to-day operations and a business administrator to supervise the business functions of the district.

References

External links
Blairstown Township School District

School Data for the Blairstown Township School District, National Center for Education Statistics
North Warren Regional School District

North Warren Regional High School, National Center for Education Statistics

Blairstown, New Jersey
Hardwick Township, New Jersey
New Jersey District Factor Group FG
School districts in Warren County, New Jersey
Public elementary schools in New Jersey